Tshepo Howard Mosese (born 19 July 1983) is a South African rapper, songwriter and actor. Mosese was involved  in school choirs and cultural  activities. He was a member of Gunpowder group. Having signed with Faith Records in 2007, he began his solo career and released  solo debut album  Cut to the Chase (2007).

Mosese also pursued  his acting career, Backstage, Scandal, 7de Laan, Big Up, All You Need is Love (2012).

Early years
In 2002 he joined the hip hop group Gunpowder which was, at the time, under the same label as Kabelo Mabalane. In 2007 Kabelo, AKA Bouga Luv offered Howza a record deal as a solo artist under faith records.

Acting career 
Howza has also gone on to appear on e.tv’s Backstage in a lead role as the character "Chase". He also appeared in Generations as a supporting character, "Adam" and plays "Lerumo Chabedi" in South African soap opera Scandal!.

References

1983 births
Living people
South African musicians